Walvis Bay is a city in Namibia and the name of the bay on which it lies. It is the second largest city in Namibia and the largest coastal city in the country.

The bay is a safe haven for sea vessels because of its natural deepwater harbour, protected by the Pelican Point sand spit, being the only natural harbour of any size along the country's coast. Being rich in plankton and marine life, these waters also drew large numbers of southern right whales, attracting whalers and fishing vessels.

A succession of colonists developed the location and resources of this strategic harbour settlement. The harbour's value in relation to the sea route around the Cape of Good Hope had caught the attention of world powers since it was discovered by the outside world in 1485. This explains the complicated political status of Walvis Bay down the years.

The town is situated just north of the Tropic of Capricorn in the Kuiseb River delta and lies at the end of the TransNamib Railway to Windhoek, and on B2 road.

Walvis Bay, with its large bay and sand dunes, is an important centre of tourism activity in Namibia. Attractions include the artificial Bird Island, centre of a guano collection industry, the Dune 7 sand dune, the salt works, the abundant birdlife, and a museum. Kuisebmund Stadium, home to two clubs in the Namibia Premier League, is also located in the city. The beach resort of Langstrand lies just a few kilometres north. The Walvis Bay Export Processing Zone is an important facet of the local economy.

Etymology 

The Dutch referred to it as Walvisch Baye and the English as Whale Bay. In its eventual formal incorporation, it was named Walfish Bay, which was changed to Walvish Bay, and ultimately to Walvis Bay. It has also been referred to as Walwich Bay or Walwisch Bay. The Herero people of the area called it Ezorongondo.

History 

Portuguese navigator Diogo Cão reached Cape Cross, north of the bay, in 1485. There followed Bartolomeu Dias, who anchored his flagship São Cristóvão in what is now Walvis Bay on 8 December 1487, on his expedition to discover a sea route to the East via the Cape of Good Hope. He named the bay "O Golfo de Santa Maria da Conceição". However, the Portuguese did not formally stake a claim to Walvis Bay.

Walvis Bay was founded at the end of the 18th century as a stopover for sea travel between Cape Town and the Netherlands by the Dutch East India Company. No permanent (year round) settlement was attempted and little commercial development occurred on the site until the late 19th century. In the meantime, the Cape Colony had become British, and during the Scramble for Africa, the British claimed Walvis Bay. They permitted the Cape Colony to complete the annexation of the territory in 1884, together with the Penguin Islands, following initial steps which had been taken in 1878.

In 1910, Walvis Bay, as part of the Cape Colony, became part of the newly formed Union of South Africa.

The exclave was overrun by the Germans during the South West Africa Campaign early in the First World War, but the Union Defence Force (UDF) of South Africa eventually ousted the Germans in 1915. Subsequently, Walvis Bay was quickly integrated into the new martial law regime in South West Africa.

South Africa was later awarded control (a Class "C" mandate) over South West Africa by the League of Nations to administer the territory. Civilian rule was restored in South West Africa in 1921 and administration of Walvis Bay was transferred to South West Africa under the South West Africa Affairs Act of 1922.

Despite the territory never having been part of German South West Africa, the Act stated that: "the port and settlement of Walvis Bay, which forms part of the Cape of Good Hope, shall for judicial and administrative purposes be regarded as if it were part of the mandated territory of South West Africa". However, South Africa had also sought to annex South West Africa itself, and had presented such a proposal to the League of Nations. Consequently, in 1949, the Act was amended to give representation in the Parliament of South Africa to whites in South West Africa.

In 1977, following increasing international pressure to relinquish its control over South West Africa, South Africa repealed the Act, but transferred control of Walvis Bay back to the Cape Province, thereby making it an exclave. From 1980, it was represented in both the Provincial Council and the House of Assembly as part of the Green Point constituency in Cape Town, before becoming a separate constituency in 1982.

In response, the United Nations Security Council passed Resolution 432 (1978), which declared that "the territorial integrity and unity of Namibia must be assured through the reintegration of Walvis Bay within its territory".

In 1990, South West Africa gained independence as Namibia, but Walvis Bay remained under South African sovereignty, with South Africa increasing the number of troops. However, in 1992, the two countries agreed to establish a transitional Joint Administrative Authority for Walvis Bay and the Offshore Islands. The Authority was headed by two Chief Executive Officers, Nangolo Mbumba, then Secretary to the Namibian Cabinet, and Carl von Hirschberg, former South African Ambassador to the United Nations.

In August 1993, prior to the end of apartheid, the Multiparty Negotiating Forum in South Africa passed a resolution calling for "the incorporation-reintegration of Walvis Bay and the Off-Shore Islands into Namibia."
The Transfer of Walvis Bay to Namibia Act was passed by the Parliament of South Africa that year. Following the signing of a treaty between the two countries, South Africa formally transferred sovereignty of Walvis Bay and the Penguin Islands to Namibia on 1 March 1994.

Geography

Suburbs 

Due to its South African administration Walvis Bay was developed as a segregated town. The suburb of Kuisebmond housed Black people, Narraville was inhabited by Coloureds, and Whites lived in the city centre.

After the incorporation of the town to Namibia, many people have settled in shacks around it. In an effort to reduce their impact of the informal settlements, the municipality formed the Tutaleni Housing Project to the northeast.

Climate 

Despite its location within the tropics, Walvis Bay features the very rare mild variation of the cold desert climate (BWk) according to the Köppen climate classification. It is caused by the rain shadow of the Naukluft Mountains and the cooling effect of the coastal sea temperature by the Benguela Current. Walvis Bay receives only  average precipitation per year, making it one of the driest cities on earth. Despite its dry climate, the city is relatively humid. Average relative humidity throughout the year remains above 80%. The warmest month is February with average temperature , while the coolest months are August and September with average temperature . The diurnal temperature range is also low, averaging only .

A weather station was operated on the Pelican Point headland   from 1958 to 1984.

Demographics

Economy

Tourism 

Tourism has had an increasing influence in the town's economy, with international tourists arriving at its airport and port facilities. Several cruise liners visit the port each year. With many tourism activities hosted by small and large tour operators the town has turned into a tourism destination. Accommodation is varied in both price and style ranges, catering for everyone.

The natural beauty of the surrounding desert and ocean is quite unique, and definitely a factor in the popularity of Walvis Bay.

Fishing 

In Walvis Bay there are different fishing companies like Hangana Seafood, Caroline Fishing, Benguella Fishing Company, Cadilu Fishing, Etosha Fisheries, Kuiseb Fishing Enterprises, Blue Ocean Products, Benguella Sea Products, Consortium Fisheries, Talanam Fish Processor. These companies catch different types of fish like snoek, horse mackerel, anchovy, white steenbras, kabeljou, kingklip, hake, catfish, tuna and sardines. Hangana Seafood are processors and exporters of fish and fish products. As such, the fishing enterprise accounts for a major part of Walvis Bay's economy.

In May 2018, a spokesman for the National Fishing Corporation of Namibia (Fishcor), confirmed that a new N$530 million onshore processing plant would be operational by September 2018. After completion, the factory (which plans to employ 700 people of which 70% will be female), promises to be the largest pelagic processing plant in sub-Saharan Africa and will process about 80 000 tonnes of fish per annum.

Manufacturing 

In March 2018 the Namibian government in association with French Groupe PSA signed an investment agreement to initiate a joint-venture to assemble Opel and Peugeot vehicles in Walvis Bay.  The N$190m-project has been earmarked to commence in 2018 with a forecasted annual target volume of 5000 units by 2020, a target carried by SACU countries' market demand. However, Peugeot threatened to close the plant over disputes with South Africa over import tariffs.

Walvis Bay Salt produces approximately 1 million tons of salt per year through solar evaporation of sea water. Most of the salt is for industrial use but the company also produces table salt under the "Cerebos" brand.

Transport 

Walvis Bay is an important logistical port for the southern African region, providing port facilities for the import and export of cargo for the rest of Namibia, Zambia, Democratic Republic of Congo, and Botswana. Since the Walvis Bay Corridor Group (WBCG) was established in 2000, cargo moving through the port has increased from 30,000 containers a year to 370,000 containers in 2016.  As of 2017 the port was being upgraded to increase its capacity to move 1 million containers a year by 2019.  Bureaucratic and logistical problems at the city's competitor port at Durban, South Africa have diverted traffic to the port at Walvis Bay. Ninety-five percent of all cargo hauled overland through Walvis Bay is carried by truck.

The Walvis Bay Corridor Group is gearing up to increase import/export-business opportunities in Namibia. The Namibian National Development Plan expects to complete the expansion programme of the Walvis Bay port by 2019. Because of the harbour's geographical positioning, authorities plan to gain a footprint in providing landlocked Southern African Development Community (SADC) countries with a vital logistical hub. In addition to the importance of the port, development would strengthen trade corridors which consists of current road and rail networks.

In an attempt to strengthen and enhance trade relations between other African countries, Namport (the Namibian Port Authority) in April 2019 signed a five-year MoU (Memorandum of Understanding) with the Port Authority of Dakar, Senegal.

Walvis Bay International Airport provides commercial flight services to the city's residents, as well as to neighbouring towns and villages. Airlink services flights between South Africa and Walvis Bay.

In August 2019 a new container terminal was opened, built on a 40-acre platform reclaimed from the sea. The terminal was built by the state-owned China Harbour Engineering Company with funds from the Namibian government and the African Development Bank, costing R4.2 billion rand.

This increases the capacity of the port to 750,000 containers per year from 350,000. The terminal also includes a dedicated cruise liner berth.

Education 

Walvis Bay has a number of public (government-run), semi-public, and private schools. Among them are Duneside High School, Duinesig Primary School, International School of Walvis Bay, The Dolphin Schools, Alexanders Private School, Kuisebmond Secondary School, Walvis Bay Private School and others. A number of kindergartens cater to young children.

The Namibian Maritime and Fisheries Institute (NAMFI) is a tertiary education institution based in town. International University of Management (IUM), Welwitchia Health Training Center and Monitronics Success College both have branches in Walvis Bay.

Politics 

Walvis Bay is governed by a municipal council that has ten seats.

Election results 

The 2015 local authority election was won by the SWAPO party which gained eight seats (5,818 votes). One seat each was won by the Democratic Turnhalle Alliance (DTA, 565 votes) and the United Democratic Front (UDF, 433 votes).

The 2020 local authority election was won by the Independent Patriots for Change (IPC), an opposition party formed in August 2020. The IPC obtained 5,043 votes and gained four seats. SWAPO was the runner-up, obtaining 3,348 votes and gaining three seats. One seat each went to the Landless People's Movement (LPM, a new party registered in 2018, 1,207 votes), the local Joint Walvis Bay Residents Association with 945 votes, and the Popular Democratic Movement (PDM, the new name of the DTA) with 658 votes.

Twin towns – sister cities 

Walvis Bay is twinned with:

  Lobatse in Botswana
  Drakenstein in South Africa
  Kristiansand in Norway.

Culture

Sports 

Walvis Bay contains open spaces, scenic beauty and unique marine and plant life. It is well suited for the outdoor lifestyle, boasting sports such as sandboarding, kiting, surfing, swimming, angling, sailing, golf and other indoor and outdoor sport codes. There is Walvis Bay Lagoon and Aquatic Activities, Kuiseb River Delta and the beach itself where people enjoy swimming and catching fish.

The  sand spit allows the adjacent water to remain smooth in very strong winds, ideal for record attempting vessels like that by the Vestas Sailrocket. The ocean side of the sand spit has a world-famous surf spot known in the international surf media as "Skeleton Bay."

The city is home to Eleven Arrows F.C. and Blue Waters F.C., football clubs that compete in the Namibia Premier League, and the Sparta Cricket Club Ground.

Former rugby player Percy Montgomery, who represented South Africa, was born in Walvis Bay.

Places of worship 

Among the places of worship, they are predominantly Christian churches and temples: Evangelical Lutheran Church in Namibia (Lutheran World Federation), Evangelical Lutheran Church in the Republic of Namibia (Lutheran World Federation), Baptist Convention of Namibia (Baptist World Alliance), Assemblies of God, Catholic Church. In addition to that there are also Anglican Churches namely St Raphael Anglican Church in Mondesa, St Mathews Anglican Church close to Namport as well as Seafarers Mission at Namport. There is also a Muslim mosque.

Gallery

References

Notes

Further reading 

 Silverman, Melinda: Between the Atlantic and the Namib. An Environmental History of Walvis Bay , NWG, Windhoek 2004 – Namibiana Buchdepot
 de Beer, Charles: Namibia Marine Life , @tidude Graphix, Swakopmund o.J. – Namibiana Buchdepot
 Heemstra, Phillip; Smith, Margaret M.: Smith's Sea Fishes, Struik Publishers, Cape Town 2003
 Bridgeford, P. and M.: Cape Cross , Walvis Bay 2002 – Namibiana Buchdepot
 Vogt, Andreas: National Monuments in Namibia, Gamsberg Macmillan, Windhoek 2004 – Namibiana Buchdepot

External links 

 Images from Walvis Bay 
 Walvis Bay City Council
 Walvis Bay Airport Information
 Transfer of Walvis Bay To Namibia Act, 1993
 Namibia's Walvis Bay Issue – Origin and Rise of a Colonial Dispute (1992)
 Prime Minister Vorster Speaks on Walvis Bay, Associated Press, 30 July 1978
 Namibia Reclaims Walvis Bay, Associated Press, 28 February 1994

 
Cities in Namibia
Populated coastal places in Namibia
History of South Africa

Port cities in Africa
Former British colonies and protectorates in Africa
Ramsar sites in Namibia
Populated places in the Erongo Region
Former exclaves
Port cities and towns in Namibia
Populated places established in the 1790s
1790s establishments in South West Africa